The Civil Works Residential Dwellings, also known as the Brown's Point Cottages and Corps of Engineers Houses, are a pair of historic houses at 786 and 800 Delaney Street in Anchorage, Alaska.  The two houses, mirror images of one another, are single-story wood-frame structures with wide clapboard siding, a metal gable roof, and an attached single-car garage.  Built in 1941 to house officers of the United States Army Corps of Engineers, they are among the least-altered of Anchorage's World War II-era military facilities.

The houses were listed on the National Register of Historic Places in 2004.

See also
National Register of Historic Places listings in Anchorage, Alaska

References

Houses completed in 1941
Houses in Anchorage, Alaska
Houses on the National Register of Historic Places in Alaska
Buildings and structures on the National Register of Historic Places in Anchorage, Alaska
World War II on the National Register of Historic Places in Alaska
1941 establishments in Alaska